Senate elections for a third of chamber were held in the Czech Republic on 13 and 14 November 1998 with a second round on 20 and 21 November.

The result was a victory for the Four-Coalition, which won 13 of the 27 seats up for election. The Coalition was an alliance of the Christian and Democratic Union – Czechoslovak People's Party, the Democratic Union, the Freedom Union and the Civic Democratic Alliance. However, Civic Democratic Party remained the largest Senate fraction. Voter turnout was 41% in the first round and 20.3% in the second.

The elections were held using the two-round system, with an absolute majority required to be elected.

Results

References

Czech Republic
Senate
Senate
Senate elections in the Czech Republic
Czech Republic